Man's Country is a 1938 American Western film directed by Robert F. Hill and written by Robert Emmett Tansey. The film stars Jack Randall, Marjorie Reynolds, Walter Long, Forrest Taylor, and David Sharpe. The film was released on July 6, 1938, by Monogram Pictures.

Plot

Cast          
Jack Randall as Jack Hale
Marjorie Reynolds as Madge Crane
Walter Long as Lex Crane / Buck Crane
Ralph Peters as Snappy O'Connor
Forrest Taylor as Colonel Hay 
David Sharpe as Ted Crane
Harry Harvey Sr. as Sergeant James
Charles King as Steve 
Bud Osborne as Jed
Dave O'Brien as Bert

References

External links
 

1938 films
1930s English-language films
American Western (genre) films
1938 Western (genre) films
Monogram Pictures films
Films directed by Robert F. Hill
American black-and-white films
1930s American films